Meg and Mog is a series of children's books written by Helen Nicoll and illustrated by Jan Pieńkowski. First published in the 1970s, the books are about Meg, a witch whose spells always seem to go wrong, her striped cat Mog, and their friend Owl. The first book was published in January 1972. Following the death of Helen Nicholl in 2012, the series was continued by Pieńkowski and David Walser.

TV series adaptation

In 2001, an animated TV series of 52 five-minute episodes was planned to be produced as a co-production between Telemagination, TV-Loonland AG and Absolutely Productions for a 2002–2003 delivery, with Loonland holding Non-UK rights to the series.

For unknown reasons, this plan never came through, and Absolutely instead teamed with Happy Life and Varcara to produce the series instead for a late-2003 delivery, with CITV purchasing UK broadcast rights. The series was first broadcast in the UK within that time. 

It was produced by Carl Gorham and directed by Roger Mainwood, featuring the voices of Alan Bennett as Owl, Fay Ripley as Meg and Phil Cornwell as Mog with additional voices by Morwenna Banks and Paul Shearer.

A successful stage play also ran in London in the 1980s, starring Maureen Lipman as Meg.

Titles

Book series
Meg & Mog
Mog's Missing
Meg's Mummy
Meg Up the Creek
Meg, Mog & Og
Meg at Sea
Meg on the Moon
Meg's Car
Meg's Castle
Meg's Eggs
Mog at the Zoo
Mog in the Fog
Meg's Veg
Mog's Mumps
Meg Comes to School (formally known as Owl at School)
Meg Goes to Bed
Meg And The Pirate
Meg & Mog Board Book
Meg's Cauldron
Meg's Fancy Dress
Meg's Treasure
Mog in Charge
Meg and the Dragon (first written by David Walser)
Meg's Christmas

Television series

Meg's Cauldron And Other Stories DVD:
1. Meg's Cauldron
2. Meg at the Funfair
3. Meg's Car
4. Meg's Treasure
5. Meg's Race
6. Meg's Music
7. Meg up the Creek
8. Meg and the Sheep
9. Mog's Mumps
10. Meg's Museum
11. Owl at School
12. Meg's Christmas
13. Meg and the Snow

Meg, Mog And Owl And Other Stories DVD:
14. Meg, Mog and Owl
15. Owl's Voice
16. Meg on the Moon
17. Meg's Tent
18. Meg's Cake
19. Meg At Sea
20. Meg At The Circus
21. Meg And The Baby
22. Meg's Veg
23. Mog's Hiccups
24. Mog In The Fog
25. Meg's Picnic
26. Meg's Eggs 

Others:
27. Mog's Mistake
28. Meg's Castle 
29. Meg's Fancy Dress
30. Owl's Birthday
31. Mog at the Zoo
32. Meg and the Viking
33. Meg and the Cowboy

Name

"Mog" is a short form of moggie, a word for cat that is not a specific breed.

See also

Gobbolino, the Witch's Cat
Simon Hanselmann

References

External sources

 (Meg and Mog, 1983)
 

British picture books
Children's fiction books
Fictional cats
Fictional characters introduced in 1972
Fictional witches
Series of children's books
Witchcraft in written fiction